Sri. Channavajjala Mallikarjuna Prasad, better known as C. M. Prasad, is an Indian born physician/psychiatrist in the Greater Washington Metropolis of the United States. He was born on 14 May 1948.

Education
C.M. Prasad acquired a bachelor's degree from Andhra Christian College, Guntur, Andhra University in 1968. It is from Maharaja Sayajirao University of Baroda that he graduated with a master's degree in Pharmacology in 1972. He pursued postgraduate research work at the University of Bombay and obtained his PhD in Pharmacology in 1977. He started as a research scientist at the University of Texas Medical Center in Houston in 1978. He taught and carried out research in Pharmacology at the University of Houston, TX in 1979. His research during 1978-1982 addressed studies into the mechanisms of neuronal and neurohumoral transmission. He obtained his Medical degree in 1984 at Medical School in Juarez, Mexico. That was followed by Psychiatry training in St. Elizabeths hospital in Washington DC during 1984–88, and then a year of neurology in Mt. Sinai Hospital in New York 1988–89. For his research as a Psychiatrist Dr. Prasad delved into topics of basal ganglia mineralization in schizophrenic patients.

Career
He has certifications in the area of Psychiatry and Addiction Medicine. Dr. Prasad is actively involved in geriatric psychiatry, pain management, Prison Psychiatry and Electro Convulsive Therapy to name a few. Prasad is a long-standing member of several medical societies and professional organizations such as American Psychiatric Association, Washington Psychiatric Society, American Board of Addiction medicine, American Board of Physician Specialists, American Board of Psychiatric Medicine, American Board of Pain Management, American Association of Physicians of India Origin, National Association of certified Hypnotherapists.  As of 2011 he retired from St. Elizabeths Hospital
affiliation, the DC government staff psychiatrist position he held for over 20 years. Currently, he is an independent consultant Psychiatrist in Private practice in the area hospitals such as United Medical Center in Washington, DC, Virginia Hospital Center in Arlington and at the Alexandria, Fairfax, and Fair Oaks INOVA Hospitals in Northern Virginia. He is also the Medical Director in a Neighbors' Cosejo a nonprofit organization for the benefit of Homeless Hispanic population in need of services for mental health, alcohol/substance abuse, rehabilitation and affordable housing in Washington, DC.

Awards
He received PARVASI award for his achievements in the field of medicine at national and international levels by Lt. Governor of Pondicherry Sardar Dr. Iqbal Singh at an event held in Hotel Le Meridian of New Delhi.
He has been elected to the status of a Distinguished Fellow of the American Psychiatric Association in December 2011.
He is a recipient of the Global organization of People of India Origin (GOPIO) award in 2007 for outstanding professional presentation on mental health issues facing India and unswerving and undaunted support for the vision and mission of GOPIO.
On 14 December 2010 he was honored by the "Maryland India Business Round Table"(MIBRT) with the "MIBRT award for excellence in Psychiatry and Addiction Medicine Practice & Counseling Service of the year".
He received the honor from Honorable Ben Cardin, Maryland Senator, in recognition of his commitment and services in providing Medical, Psychiatric and Counseling in the Washington DC metro area.
On 26 May 2011 he received Maryland Governor's Citation in recognition of leadership in promoting business, trade and job growth in Maryland.
He has been recognized in House of Representatives Congressional Record on 6 September 2018 for his exceptional contributions to the international medical 
community.

Publications

References

External links
Aapiusa.org

Indian psychiatrists
Living people
1948 births
Andhra University alumni
Medical doctors from Andhra Pradesh
People from Guntur